The North Carolina judicial elections of 1996 were held statewide on November 5, 1996, to elect judges to the North Carolina Supreme Court and North Carolina Court of Appeals. A total of three seats were on the ballot, and in each case, incumbents who had been appointed by Gov. Jim Hunt (running for re-election that same day) were elected to terms in their own right.

Supreme Court

Chief Justice seat

Parker seat

Court of Appeals

Footnotes

Judicial
1996